Gholwad is a village in the Palghar district of Maharashtra, India. It is located in the Dahanu taluka.  It is famous for its production of quality chickoos.

Demographics 

According to the 2011 census of India, Gholwad has population of 4403. The effective literacy rate (i.e. the literacy rate of population excluding children aged 6 and below) is 82.59%.

References 

Villages in Dahanu taluka